Full-Court Miracle is a 2003 Disney Channel Original Hanukkah Movie. It premiered on November 21, 2003. Inspired by the true story of University of Virginia Cavaliers basketball star Lamont Carr, the film centers on a group of young Jewish basketball players who search for a coach to help them out of a slump during the Hanukkah season. It was filmed in Toronto.

Plot

Alex "Schlots" Schlotsky (Alex D. Linz) is a 14-year-old freshman at Philadelphia Hebrew Academy, where he and his friends are on the school's struggling basketball team, the Lions. The Lions dream of winning the Liberty Tournament and defeating their school's rivals, the Warriors, but the basketball team doesn't have a good coach. Schlots and his friends are determined to find their own Judah Macabee to coach their team. During one day of practice at a local park, Schlots finds the man he believes is the right coach for the basketball team: Lamont Carr (Richard T. Jones), a college basketball star whose knee injury prevented him from getting into the NBA. There are many hurdles Schlots and Lamont must overcome over the course of the movie: Lamont is homeless after leaving his wife and son in Virginia with the hopes of being signed by the Philadelphia 76ers; Schlots must convince Lamont that coaching his ragtag group is worth his time, energy, and the meager amount of money the boys can pay him. Schlots also must balance his own desires with those of his mother, who wishes for him to become a doctor and attend a medical shadowing program. Also, among the challenges they must face is the school's principal, Mrs. Klein, who tries to see if Lamont is safe to be with the players.

During the boys' first days of practice under Lamont's coaching, they become exhausted and frustrated with his coaching style, but intervention by Schlots inspires Lamont to help the team love the game of basketball. One day, Mrs. Klein tries to inconspicuously tail Lamont to follow Lamont when he drives off in his van after practice. Aware of both this and Lamont's homelessness, Schlots tells him to go to a modern apartment complex where his dad is trying to get a tenant for a room he owns.

When Schlots opens the door for Lamont, Mrs. Klein is outside the apartment complex. Lamont and Mr. Schlotsky come to an agreement: Lamont can live in the apartment for free Mr. Schlotsky can find a tenant. Later, when the Lions players are anticipating the big Liberty Tournament, Lamont tells the team that he has received an offer for a 10-day contract from the Philadelphia 76ers and he is going to accept it. This means the Lions must try to win the tournament without their coach. The Lions prove successful, winning every game in the tournament.
 
On the day of the final game, Schlots finally confronts his mother and gets her to appreciate his love for basketball. She convinces his best friend Julie to forgive him.

The final game in the Liberty Tournament takes place on a stormy night. While it is going on, Schlots' mother drives Julie to it. Then she goes to a 76ers game Lamont is playing to try to convince him to come to the Liberty tournament final, offering to drive Lamont, whose van has broken down to the tournament before he can leave for the airport with the rest of the 76ers.  Once Schlots' mother arrives to the game, she speaks to one of Lamont's opponents about Schlots' dreams, and she comes to understand him even more afterward. After she finds Lamont, his car works again and she seems to have begun to understand everybody.

The storm eventually knocks out the power in the school's gymnasium. After the school mobilizes an emergency generator for the remainder of the game, the Lions and the Warriors agree to continue the game with the understanding that whenever the fuel in the generator runs out, the game will end and the team with the most points at that time will win. The Warriors devise a plan to make sure it is them: when they are ahead in the game and it becomes clear that the fuel in the generator is moments away from running out, the Warriors will call a timeout that will last until the remaining fuel in the generator is exhausted. The Lions are outraged and discouraged until Lamont appears in the gym and encourages them to not lose faith. The power then once again goes out in the gym – and the Warriors celebrate what they believe is their victory – until the generator restarts despite being out of gas, and the power comes back on. The final moments of the game consist of the Lions catching up to the Warriors, and with the final seconds on the clock ticking down, Schlots passes the ball instead of trying to take the final shot himself, per his usual self, leading to the Lions scoring the winning basket.

The entire school celebrates, and Lamont's wife and son enter the gym and announce plans to stay with Lamont, who reveals to the Lions that he plans to become their full-time coach.  In the end, Schlots has convinced his mother to let him play basketball and in fact only showed up at the end of the game so she could bring Lamont's family to him while Lamont helped the Lions. The final scene of the movie consists of Schlots and Lamont's families playing a game the basketball with Julie, and Schlots' mother turns out to be a pretty good player. Rabbi Lewis' story of Hanukkah and how it relates to the basketball game plays over the scene.

Cast
 Alex D. Linz as Alex "Schlots" Schlotsky
 Richard T. Jones as Lamont Carr
 R. H. Thomson as Rabbi Lewis
 Sean Marquette as Ben "Big Ben" Swartz
 Erik Knudsen as T. J. Murphy
 David Sazant as "Joker" Levy
 Sheila McCarthy as Mrs. Klein
 Linda Kash as Cynthia Schlotsky
 Jason Blicker as Marshall Schlotsky
 Cassie Steele as Julie
 Jack Manchester as Tyler
 Ron Gabriel as Coach Simowitz
 Stan Coles as Larry
 Sean Loucks as Bob, The Referee
 Gina Kash as Sarah Lewis
 Dan Willmott as Tow Truck Driver
 Elle Downes as Charmaine
 Jerome Williams as Himself

Reception
Laura Fries of Variety was critical of the film, writing that director Stuart Gillard "misses a prime opportunity to present a poignant and entertaining multicultural alternative to the usual holiday viewing". She wrote that Gillard "lays the groundwork for a meaningful drama but inconsistently intersperses fantasy elements and slapstick comedy". Joe Eskenazi of JWeekly found the adult characters one-dimensional but applauded the younger actors. He called the film "cheesy" but nevertheless "sort of liked it".

References

External links
 

American basketball films
Disney Channel Original Movie films
Films about Jews and Judaism
2000s English-language films
2003 television films
2003 films
Films directed by Stuart Gillard
Hanukkah films
Films set in Philadelphia
Films shot in Toronto
2000s American films